Stepan Antonovich Stoichev (17 May 1891 – 15 January 1944) was a Soviet philologist, specialist in literary criticism, Head of Nizhniy Novgorod Pedagogical Institute (now Kozma Minin Nizhny Novgorod State Pedagogical University), Head of N. I. Lobachevsky State University of Nizhny Novgorod, Head of Perm University, and Head of Voronezh Pedagogical Institute (now Voronezh State Pedagogical University).

Sources
 Article about Stepan Stoichev by Kartseva N.P.: Карцева Н. П. Штрихи к портрету ректора // Материалы конференции «Пермская элита: история, развитие, современное состояние» (январь–февраль 2003 г.)]
 Kostitsin V.I. Stoichev Stepan Antonovich // Heads of Perm State University. 1916-2006 (Russian)
 Stepan Stoichev at Russian Wikipedia: Стойчев, Степан Антонович // Википедия, свободная энциклопедия.

References

1891 births
1944 deaths
Russian philologists
Moscow State University alumni
Communist Party of the Soviet Union members
Soviet literary historians
Soviet male writers
20th-century male writers
20th-century philologists